The Star Awards for Best Drama Serial was an award presented annually at the Star Awards, a ceremony that was established in 1994.

The category was introduced in 2000, at the 7th Star Awards ceremony; The Legendary Swordsman received the award and it is given in honour of a Mediacorp drama serial which has the highest overall viewership.

Since its inception, the award has been given to 14 drama serials. Tiger Mum was the most recent winner in this category.

The award was not presented in 2001 and 2005. Additionally, following changes to the measurement of television viewership, the award category was not presented from 2017 onwards.

Recipients

References 

Star Awards